Tritonoturris obesa is a species of sea snail, a marine gastropod mollusk in the family Raphitomidae.

Description
The length of the shell attains 28 mm.

Distribution
This marine species occurs off Northern KwaZulu-Natal, South Africa.

References

 Steyn, D.G. & Lussi, M. (1998) Marine Shells of South Africa. An Illustrated Collector's Guide to Beached Shells. Ekogilde Publishers, Hartebeespoort, South Africa, ii + 264 pp

External links
  Kilburn, R.N. (1977) Taxonomic studies on the marine Mollusca of southern Africa and Mozambique. Part 1. Annals of the Natal Museum, 23, 173–214

obesa
Gastropods described in 1977